Tyrosine-protein phosphatase non-receptor type 3 is an enzyme that in humans is encoded by the PTPN3 gene.

Function 

The protein encoded by this gene is a member of the protein tyrosine phosphatase (PTP) family. PTPs are known to be signaling molecules that regulate a variety of cellular processes including cell growth, differentiation, mitotic cycle, and oncogenic transformation. This protein contains a C-terminal PTP domain and an N-terminal domain homologous to the band 4.1 superfamily of cytoskeletal-associated proteins. P97, a cell cycle regulator involved in a variety of membrane related functions, has been shown to be a substrate of this PTP. This PTP was also found to interact with, and be regulated by adaptor protein 14-3-3 beta.

Interactions 

PTPN3 has been shown to interact with YWHAB.

References

Further reading